Hans-Peter Makan (born 1 January 1960, in Weinheim) is a retired German football player. He spent four seasons in the Bundesliga with VfB Stuttgart.

Honours
 Bundesliga champion: 1983–84
 DFB-Pokal finalist: 1985–86

References

External links
 

1960 births
Living people
German footballers
SV Sandhausen players
VfB Stuttgart players
Bundesliga players
Association football defenders
People from Weinheim
Sportspeople from Karlsruhe (region)
Footballers from Baden-Württemberg